Pryor Mynatt "Humpy" McElveen (November 5, 1881 in Atlanta, Georgia – October 27, 1951 in Pleasant Hill, Tennessee), was a  professional baseball player and coach. McElveen  played third base for the Brooklyn Dodgers from 1909 to 1911. He attended Carson–Newman College. A native of Johnson City, Tennessee, he was team captain of the 1908 Southern Association champion Nashville Vols, and was a personal friend of sportswriter Fred Russell. He coached at his alma mater Carson–Newman.

Bibliography

References

External links

1881 births
1951 deaths
Major League Baseball third basemen
Brooklyn Superbas players
Brooklyn Dodgers players
Baseball players from Georgia (U.S. state)
Carson–Newman University alumni
Knoxville (minor league baseball) players
Jacksonville Jays players
Nashville Vols players
Montgomery Billikens players
Montgomery Rebels players
Atlanta Crackers players
Knoxville Reds players
Portsmouth Truckers players
Shreveport Gassers players
Carson–Newman Eagles baseball coaches
Carson–Newman Eagles baseball players